Samuel Adams (born December 30, 1985) is an American composer. He was born in San Francisco, California. He is a recipient of a 2019 Guggenheim Fellowship.

Life and career
Adams grew up in the San Francisco Bay Area, where he performed double bass and studied composition and electroacoustics at Stanford University; he later studied with Martin Bresnick. His music draws on his experiences in a diverse array of disciplines including classical forms, microsound, noise, improvised music and field recording.

Adams has received commissions from New World Symphony, San Francisco Symphony, Carnegie Hall, and the Chicago Symphony Orchestra and has collaborated with performers such as Emanuel Ax, Sarah Cahill, Karen Gomyo, Jennifer Koh, Anthony Marwood, Joyce Yang and conductors such as David Robertson, Esa-Pekka Salonen, and Michael Tilson Thomas. He is currently one of the Chicago Symphony Orchestra's two composers-in-residence, having been jointly named to the post with Elizabeth Ogonek in 2015.

He is the son of composer John Adams and photographer Deborah O'Grady.

Notable works

Orchestral and Large Ensemble Works

 Drift and Providence (2012)
 Violin Concerto (2013)
 Radial Play (2014) 
 many words of love (2016)
 Chamber Concerto (2017)
 Movements (for Us and Them) (Concerto Grosso) (2018)
 Variations (2020)
 Echo Transcriptions (2022)
 No Such Spring (2021-2022)

Chamber Works

 Tension Studies for electric guitar, percussion, and electronics (2010 - 2011)
 String Quartet in Five Movements (2013)
 Quartet Movement (2016)
 Quintet with Pillars (2018)
 Second Quartet (2016-2019)
 Violin Diptych (2020)
 Sundial (2021)

Solo Works

 Shade Studies (2014)
 Impromptus (2015)
 Sonatas (2016)
 Playing Changes (2020)

Multimedia Works

 Lyra (2018-2020)

See also
21st-century classical music
Electroacoustic music
Composers
jazz bassists

References

External links 

1985 births
21st-century American composers
American jazz composers
American electronic musicians
American jazz musicians
Living people
Stanford University School of Humanities and Sciences alumni
American male jazz composers
21st-century American male musicians
21st-century jazz composers